PKZIP is a file archiving computer program, notable for introducing the popular ZIP file format.  PKZIP was first introduced for MS-DOS on the IBM-PC compatible platform in 1989.  Since then versions have been released for a number of other architectures and operating systems.  PKZIP was originally written by Phil Katz and marketed by his company PKWARE, Inc starting in 1986. The company bears his initials: 'PK'.

History

By the 1970s, file archiving programs were distributed as standard utilities with operating systems.  They include the Unix utilities ar, shar, and tar.  These utilities were designed to gather a number of separate files into a single archive file for easier copying and distribution.  These archives could optionally be passed through a stream compressor utility, such as compress and others.

Other archivers also appeared during the 1980s, including ARC by System Enhancement Associates, Inc. (SEA), Rahul Dhesi's ZOO, Dean W. Cooper's DWC, LHarc by Haruhiko Okomura and Haruyasu Yoshizaki and ARJ which stands for "Archived by Robert Jung".

The development of PKZIP was first announced in the file SOFTDEV.DOC from within the PKPAK 3.61 package, stating it would develop a new and yet unnamed compression program. The announcement had been made following the  lawsuit between SEA and PKWARE, Inc. Although SEA won the suit, it lost the compression war, as the user base migrated to PKZIP as the compressor of choice. Led by some BBS sysops who refused to accept or offer files compressed as .ARC files, users began recompressing any old archives that were currently stored in .ARC format into .ZIP files.

The first version was released in 1989, as a DOS command-line tool, distributed under shareware model with a US$25 registration fee (US$47 with manual).

.ZIP file format

To help ensure the interoperability of the ZIP format, Phil Katz published the original .ZIP File Format Specification in the APPNOTE.TXT documentation file. PKWARE continued to maintain this document and periodically published updates. Originally only bundled with registered versions of PKZIP, it was later available on the PKWARE site.

The specification has its own version number, which does not necessarily correspond to the PKZIP version numbers, especially with PKZIP 6 or later. At various times, PKWARE adds preliminary features that allows PKZIP products to extract archives using advanced features, but PKZIP products that create such archives won't be available until the next major release.

Compatibility
Although popular at the time, ZIP archives using PKZIP 1.0 compression methods are now rare, and many unzip tools such as 7-Zip are able to read and write several other archive formats.

Patents
Shrinking uses dynamic LZW, on which Unisys held patents. A patent for the Reduce Algorithm had also been filed on June 19, 1984, long before PKZIP was produced.

See also
 Comparison of file archivers
 List of archive formats
 PKLite

References

External links

Official
 , PKWARE
 PKZIP from PKWARE 
 PKZIP 2.50 for DOS
 SecureZIP from PKWARE 
 APPNOTE

Other
 SecureZIP Homepage
 Commentary from SEA owner about Phil Katz, the lawsuit, and his death
 CONTROVERSY: LAWSUITS: SEA vs. PKWARE
 Judgment in favor of SEA in SEA v. PKWARE and Phil Katz
 How to Use PKZIP From the Command Line

Data compression software
File archivers
Windows compression software